Laura J. Bloomberg is an American administrator in higher education and the eighth president of Cleveland State University. Bloomberg served as Cleveland State University’s provost before being appointed president.

Prior to her career at Cleveland State University, she held the positions of dean and associate dean of the Humphrey School of Public Affairs at the University of Minnesota.

Early life and education 
Bloomberg earned a Bachelor of Science in special education and teaching from St. Cloud State University, a Master of Science in education psychology and measurement from Cornell University, and a Ph.D. in educational policy and administration from the University of Minnesota.

Career 
Bloomberg began her career at the University of Minnesota as the associate director of the Institute on Community Integration and also taught in the Educational Policy and Administration Department. Bloomberg also served as principal and K-12 district administrator of the West Metro Education Program.

In 2013, Bloomberg was appointed associate dean of the Humphrey School of Public Affairs. In 2017, she became the school’s seventh dean and first female dean.

In 2021, Bloomberg left the University of Minnesota to become the provost and senior vice president for academic affairs at Cleveland State University. Bloomberg was named the University’s eighth president in 2022, succeeding Harlan M. Sands.

Publications 
 Public Value and Public Administration (co-editor)
 Creating Public Value in Practice: Advancing the Common Good in a Multi-Sector, Shared-Power, No-One-Wholly-in-Charge World (co-editor)

References 

Presidents of Cleveland State University
Cleveland State University faculty
St. Cloud State University alumni
Cornell University alumni
University of Minnesota alumni
Year of birth missing (living people)
Living people
Women deans (academic)
University of Minnesota faculty
American school principals
American university and college faculty deans
Women school principals and headteachers